Feel the Music was Ray Stevens' fourteenth studio album and his second for Warner Bros. Records, released in 1977. Like Stevens' previous album, this album is devoted completely to the styles of country music. "Get Crazy With Me" and "Dixie Hummingbird" are two singles that were lifted from the album.

Track listing

Personnel
Arranged and Produced by: Ray Stevens
Recorded at: Ray Stevens Sound Laboratory, Nashville
Engineer: Tom Knox
Photographed and Designed by: Ed Thrasher
Illustrations by: Peter Palombi
Bass: Jack Williams, Tommy Cogbill, Mike Leech
Drums: Jerry Kroon, Jerry Carrigan ("Set the Children Free" only)
Guitars: Mark Casstevens, Reggie Young, Grady Martin, Johnny Christopher ("Set the Children Free" only)
Harmonica: Charlie McCoy, Terry McMillan
Horns: Ray Stevens, Denis H. Solee
Keyboards: Ray Stevens
Strings: Sheldon Kurland String Section
Background Voices: Ray Stevens, Prissy Reed, Toni Wine, Mt. Pisgah Young People's Chorus

Charts
Album - Billboard (North America)

Singles - Billboard (North America)

References

1977 albums
Ray Stevens albums
Warner Records albums